The Taiwan Cement Corporation (TCC) is a cement company headquartered in Taiwan.  Their main business includes the production and trading of cement, paper bags, and other paper products, under the "品牌水泥" namebrand.

They are the central component of TCC Group, which grew from the cement plant.

History
After the handover of Taiwan from Japan to the Republic of China in 1945, the Taiwan Provincial Government and Ministry of Economics Resource Committee jointly incorporated the Taiwan Cement Limited Corporation on 1 May 1946. On 1 January 1951, the company was restructured as Taiwan Cement Corporation. 

On 11 November 1954, the state owned company was privatized and became a publicly listed corporation, and the Lukang Gu (Koo) family took over the management. In 1962, the stock was listed under the code 1101, making it the first listed company in Taiwan. 

The company diversified, with the cement industry remaining at its core, and became the TCC Group. The TCC Group affiliates include: TCC Green Energy, Hong Kong Cement, Wanqing Cement, Fengsheng Industrial, Guanghe Refractory, Shimin Engineering, Heping Harbor, Dongcheng Quarry, Heping Power, Dahe Environmental Services, Dahe Changbei Environmental Protection, Dahe Dafeng Environmental Protection, Taiwan Express Warehousing, Dahe Shipping, Xinchang Chemical, TCC Chemical, TCC Int'l Ltd., Taiwan Guanghe Construction, TCC Information, Xinchang Investment, Fortune Products Investment, China Rubber International, Nengyuan Technology, and others.

Chairmen
Koo Chen-fu
Chester Koo (until 2001) - son of Koo Chen-fu
Leslie Koo (2003–2017) - son of Koo Chen-fu
Nelson Chang (2017–present) - interim Chairman and brother-in-law of Leslie Koo

Head Office
The company headquarter (Taiwan Cement Building) is accessible within walking distance south west from Zhongshan Elementary School Station of Taipei Metro at 113 Zhongshan Road North Section 2. The building was completed in 2002 by Taiwanese architect M. L. Kuo.

See also
 List of companies of Taiwan

References

External links

 

Taiwanese companies established in 1946
Cement companies of Taiwan
Manufacturing companies established in 1946
Taiwanese brands